Certificación Fonográfica Centroamericana (CFC) is a music certification organization that represents the music industry in the Central American countries, Costa Rica, El Salvador, Guatemala, Panama, Honduras and Nicaragua. It is managed by a collaboration of the different music industry trade organization in the region, FONOTICA in Costa Rica, AGINPRO in Guatemala, ASAP EGC in El Salvador and PRODUCE in Panama.

Certification levels and methodology 
CFC awards certifications based on streaming only. The levels of certification are:
 Gold: 3,500,000 streams
 Platinum: 7,000,000 streams
 Diamond: 35,000,000 streams

References

External links
 

Organizations established in 2021
Music industry associations
Music organizations based in North America
2021 establishments in North America